Sanela is a Bosnian first name shared by the following people:

Sanela Diana Jenkins (born 1973), Bosnian entrepreneur and philanthropist
Sanela Knezović (born 1979), Bosnian-born Croatian handball player
Sanela Redžić, Bosnian disabled athlete
Sanela Sijerčić, Bosnian folk singer

Bosnian feminine given names